The  was a commuter electric multiple unit (EMU) train type owned and operated by the third-sector railway company Hokuso Railway on the Hokuso Line in Japan from March 2006 until March 2015. The single eight-car train was formed from two former Keisei 3300 series four-car EMU sets leased from Keisei Electric Railway.

Formation
The fleet consisted of a single eight-car set formed of two permanently coupled four-car sets as shown below, with all cars motored, and car 1 at the southern end.

The "M1" cars each had one lozenge-type pantograph.

History
Formed of two former Keisei 3300 series four-car sets, the 7260 series trainset entered service on the Hokuso Railway in March 2006.

Withdrawal
The 7260 series trainset was withdrawn following its final day in revenue service on 22 March 2015.

References

Electric multiple units of Japan
Train-related introductions in 2006
Kawasaki multiple units
1500 V DC multiple units of Japan
Tokyu Car multiple units